Usha Devi (born 25 May 1952) is an Indian politician. She is a Biju Janata Dal MLA from the constituency of Chikiti (Odisha Vidhan Sabha constituency) in Odisha.

References

Living people
Biju Janata Dal politicians
Women in Odisha politics
1952 births
Odisha MLAs 2019–2024
21st-century Indian women politicians